T. B. McClintic, also known as the Atlantic IV, is a historic quarantine boarding tug located at St. Andrews, New Brunswick, Canada. She was built in 1932 by the Bath Iron Works for the U.S. Public Health Service.  The vessel is 60 feet, 10 inches in length overall with a 16.5-foot breadth and a 9.2-foot draft.  For most of her service, she was stationed at the Baltimore Quarantine Station in Baltimore, Maryland.  In 1961, the City of Wilmington, North Carolina acquired the ship for use as a fireboat and renamed her the Atlantic IV.  She was sold to a private party in 1985.

It was added to the National Register of Historic Places in 1994.

References

Ships on the National Register of Historic Places in North Carolina
Buildings and structures completed in 1932
Buildings and structures in Brunswick County, North Carolina
National Register of Historic Places in Brunswick County, North Carolina
Tugboats of the United States